The 1984 United States presidential election in Michigan took place on November 6, 1984. All 50 states and the District of Columbia, were part of the 1984 United States presidential election. Voters chose 20 electors to the Electoral College, which selected the president and vice president of the United States. Michigan was won by incumbent United States President Ronald Reagan of California, who was running against former Vice President Walter Mondale of Minnesota. Reagan ran for a second time with vice president George H. W. Bush of Texas, and Mondale ran with Representative Geraldine Ferraro of New York, the first major female candidate for the vice presidency.

The presidential election of 1984 was a very partisan election for Michigan, with just over 99% of the electorate voting only either Democratic or Republican, though several more parties appeared on the ballot. All but five counties gave Reagan a majority; one (Marquette) gave him a plurality. Mondale carried just four counties, all with a majority: Wayne County (home of Detroit), and tiny Iron, Keweenaw, and Gogebic Counties, all in the Upper Peninsula, a region then typified by heavy unionization and the mining industry.

Michigan weighed in for this election as 0.77% more Republican than the national average. , this is the last election in which Washtenaw County, Genesee County, and Marquette County voted for a Republican Presidential candidate.

Reagan won the election in Michigan with a decisive 19% landslide, making it 0.8% more Republican than the nation at large. Reagan performed particularly strongly in suburban Oakland County, which he won by over 100,000 raw votes, but he performed strongly almost throughout Michigan's Lower Peninsula (home to a vast majority of its population), including most of its major population centers aside from Wayne County: Oakland, Macomb (Warren), Kent (Grand Rapids), Genesee (Flint), Ingham (Lansing), Washtenaw (Ann Arbor), Kalamazoo (Kalamazoo), and Saginaw (Saginaw) all gave Reagan majorities. No nominee had carried so few counties in Michigan's Lower Peninsula since 1952; Stevenson had carried Macomb as well as Wayne in 1956; Goldwater had carried three counties in the Lower Peninsula in 1964; and even McGovern had carried Washtenaw and rural Lake County, in addition to Wayne, in 1972.

Unlike in Pennsylvania and some of the other Upper Midwest states, there were few signs in 1984 of Michigan's imminent transition to becoming part of the 'Blue Wall' from 1992 through 2012. Whereas in some other states, Reagan either lost or only narrowly won working-class areas, he scored powerful wins in Macomb and Saginaw Counties. There were also few rural Democratic redoubts in the state in 1984, unlike in many other states. And whereas Mondale made inroads elsewhere in the country in 'cultural elite' counties (college counties, high-tech areas, and artists' colonies), flipping, for example, Marin and Santa Cruz Counties, CA, Tompkins County, NY, Arlington County, VA, and Lane County, OR, in Michigan, Washtenaw County—home to the University of Michigan—flipped against Mondale, despite having voted even for McGovern in 1972. And, as elsewhere, Reagan scored heavily in the state's affluent suburbs (particularly concentrated, in Michigan, in Oakland County). In 1988, Michigan would continue its run of voting more Republican than the nation, although this time only slightly more so, before turning blue for six elections straight in 1992.

As of 2020, this marks the last time a Republican presidential candidate has carried Washtenaw County, Genesee County, or Marquette County. This is also the last election where Michigan voted to the right of Ohio.

Democratic platform
Walter Mondale accepted the Democratic nomination for presidency after pulling narrowly ahead of Senator Gary Hart of Colorado and Rev. Jesse Jackson of Illinois - his main contenders during what would be a very contentious Democratic primary. During the campaign, Mondale was vocal about reduction of government spending, and, in particular, was vocal against heightened military spending on the nuclear arms race against the Soviet Union, which was reaching its peak on both sides in the early 1980s.

Taking a (what was becoming the traditional liberal) stance on the social issues of the day, Mondale advocated for gun control, the right to choose regarding abortion, and strongly opposed the repeal of laws regarding institutionalized prayer in public schools. He also criticized Reagan for what he charged was his economic marginalization of the poor, stating that Reagan's reelection campaign was "a happy talk campaign," not focused on the real issues at hand.

A very significant political move during this election: the Democratic Party nominated Representative Geraldine Ferraro to run with Mondale as Vice-President. Ferraro is the first female candidate to receive such a nomination in United States history. She said in an interview at the 1984 Democratic National Convention that this action "opened a door which will never be closed again," speaking to the role of women in politics.

Republican platform

By 1984, Reagan was very popular with voters across the nation as the President who saw them out of the economic stagflation of the early and middle 1970's, and into a period of (relative) economic stability.

The economic success seen under Reagan was politically accomplished (principally) in two ways. The first was initiation of deep tax cuts for the wealthy, and the second was a wide-spectrum of tax cuts for crude oil production and refinement, namely, with the 1980 Windfall profits tax cuts. These policies were augmented with a call for heightened military spending, and the cutting of social welfare programs for the poor. Collectively called "Reaganomics", these economic policies were established through several pieces of legislation passed between 1980 and 1987.

These new tax policies also arguably curbed several existing tax loopholes, preferences, and exceptions, but Reaganomics is typically remembered for its trickle down effect of taxing poor Americans more than rich ones. Reaganomics has (along with legislation passed under presidents George H. W. Bush and Bill Clinton) been criticized by many analysts as "setting the stage" for economic troubles in the United States after 2007, such as the Great Recession.

Virtually unopposed during the Republican primaries, Reagan ran on a campaign of furthering his economic policies. Reagan vowed to continue his "war on drugs," passing sweeping legislation after the 1984 election in support of mandatory minimum sentences for drug possession.  Furthermore, taking a (what was becoming the traditional conservative) stance on the social issues of the day, Reagan strongly opposed legislation regarding comprehension of gay marriage, abortion, and (to a lesser extent) environmentalism, regarding the final as simply being bad for business.

Results

Results by county

See also
 Presidency of Ronald Reagan
 United States presidential elections in Michigan

References

Michigan
1984
1984 Michigan elections